Leibniz' law may refer to:

 The product rule
 General Leibniz rule, a generalization of the product rule
 Identity of indiscernibles

See also
Leibniz (disambiguation)
Leibniz's rule (disambiguation)